Jamaica competed at the 1998 Winter Olympics in Nagano, Japan.

 Devon Harris (two-man pilot)
 Michael Morgan (two-man brakeman)
 Chris Stokes (four-man pusher)
 Dudley Stokes (four-man pilot)
 Wayne Thomas (four-man brakeman)
 Winston Watt (four-man pusher)

Bobsleigh

References
 Official Olympic Reports
 Olympic Winter Games 1998, full results by sports-reference.com

Nations at the 1998 Winter Olympics
1998 Winter Olympics
Winter Olympics